Peio (Péj in local dialect) is a comune (municipality) in Trentino in the northern Italian region Trentino-Alto Adige/Südtirol, located about  northwest of Trento.

Peio borders the following municipalities: Martell, Valfurva, Rabbi, Ponte di Legno, Vermiglio, Ossana and Pellizzano.

History 
Until the end of World War I (1918) Peio, as the whole region, was part of the Austro-Hungarian Empire; the border between the Empire and the Kingdom of Italy was in the mountains over Peio, where a hard war took place, among cliffs, snow and glaciers. Even today, thanks to the melting of glaciers, can be found pieces of army equipment. A small museum in Peio shows them, together with filmed documents of those battles.

Peio was, till recent decades, a hamlet in the mountains, which sustained itself on agriculture and cattle raising. Since 1970 a rapid development began, making Peio a ski resort and a centre dedicated to wellness. Peio valley is rich in mineral waters, which now are exploited not only to produce bottled water but also for therapeutic purposes.

Another important factor of Peio's touristic development is its location in Stelvio National Park, a vast mountain zone where vegetal and animal biodiversity is strictly preserved. Easy walks and more difficult trekking routes allow visitors to explore valleys and woodlands from Passo del Tonale to Ortles.

Demographic evolution

References

External links
 Homepage of the city

Cities and towns in Trentino-Alto Adige/Südtirol